The 2015 Sudan Premier League is the 44th season of top-tier football in Sudan. The season began play on 26 January 2015. Al Hilal Omdurman are the defending champions, having won their 28th championship, more than the rest of the clubs in the league combined.

The league comprises 15 teams, the bottom three of which will be relegated to regional leagues for 2016, while the next lowest team will compete in a playoff with a regional league team for a spot in the 2016 Sudan Premier League.

Teams

A total of 15 teams will contest the league, including 12 sides from the 2014 season and four promoted from the regional leagues as the Sudan Premier League expanded to 15 teams this season. The four newcomers from the regional leagues are Al Ahli Wad Medani, Al Merghani, Hilal Obayed and Merikh Kosti.

El-Ahli Atbara, Al Nil and Al Ittihad were the last three teams of the 2014 season and will play in the regional leagues for the 2015 season. Al Hilal Omdurman are the defending champions from the 2014 season.

Stadiums and locations

League table

Result table

References

Sudan Premier League seasons
Sudan
Sudan
football